J is the tenth letter of the Latin alphabet.

J may also refer to:
 Palatal approximant in the International Phonetic Alphabet
 J, Cyrillic letter Je

Astronomy 
 J,  a provisional designation prefix for some objects discovered between May 1 and 15 of a year

Computing 
 J (programming language), successor to APL
 J# programming language for the Microsoft .NET Framework
 J operator, a programming construct
 J (operating system), an operating system for ICL's System 4 series of computers

Genetics and medicine 
 Haplogroup J (mtDNA)
 Haplogroup J (Y-DNA)
 ATC code J Antiinfectives for systemic use, a section of the Anatomical Therapeutic Chemical Classification System

Mathematics 
 J, symbol used to denote the Bessel function
 j, used as the symbol for the imaginary unit in fields where i is used for a different purpose (such as electrical current)
 j and j2 (or ) are also used for the complex cube roots of unity
 j, a number with the property j 2 = +1, used in the definition of the split-complex numbers
 j, the second imaginary unit of a quaternion
 , an index variable in a matrix
 The j-invariant, a modular function

Physics 
 J, Joule, the SI unit of energy
 J, the SI-recommended dimension symbol for luminous intensity, conventionally rendered in a sans-serif typeface
 , current density
 second moment of area
 J, name given by Samuel C. C. Ting for the J/ψ particle
 J-coupling, indirect dipole-dipole coupling between two nuclear spins

Music 
 J, stage name of Jang Ye-eun, a member of the K-Pop group STAYC
 J (Korean singer), a Korean pop singer
 J (musician), a Japanese rock musician
 J., nickname of American White Zombie guitarist Jay Yuenger
J., stage name of German musician Jaye Muller
 J Mascis, American singer and guitarist of Dinosaur Jr.
 J Records, a record label

Albums
 J, album by Lazza List of number-one hits of 2020 (Italy)

Songs
 "J", song by Reggie and the Full Effect from the album Last Stop: Crappy Town
 "J", song by Mindless Self Indulgence from the album Frankenstein Girls Will Seem Strangely Sexy

Film and television 
 Agent J, a character in the Men in Black films portrayed by Will Smith
 J, an antagonist in Bobobo
 Kamen Rider J, a Japanese movie
J, the production code for the 1964 Doctor Who serial Planet of Giants

Writers 
 J (sometimes given as I), pen name of the Danish novelist Cornelia von Levetzow (1836–1921)

Transport 

 J (Los Angeles Railway)
 J (New York City Subway service)
 J Church (San Francisco Muni)
 J Line (Los Angeles Metro)
 NZR J Class, a 4-8-2 type class of steam locomotive used by New Zealand Railways

Other uses 
 J, slang for joint (cannabis)
 J, slang for Air Jordan shoes
 J, slang for a jump shot in basketball
 J band (disambiguation)
 J (psychedelic), an entactogenic drug
 J (New York City Subway service)
 J Church, a light rail line in San Francisco
 Elgin, Joliet and Eastern Railway, a Chicago railway sometimes referred to as "The J"
 J, the international license plate code for Japan
 J, the Canadian postal code for the western and northern regions of Quebec
 J, German mint mark for the city of Hamburg
 J abbreviation for Jahwist, one of the hypothesized major authors of the Torah
 J, an abbreviated title of a High Court judge (in Law Reports, etc.), e.g. Bloggs J
 J. The Jewish News of Northern California, a weekly newspaper serving the Jewish community in Northern California
 J, the narrator of Jerome K. Jerome's novel Three Men in a Boat
 J., Jezper Söderlund, the trance artist
 Lamborghini Aventador J, a 2012 Lamborghini supercar
 J (novel), a 2014 novel by Howard Jacobson
 ʲ, the symbol for Palatalization in the IPA
 Juliet, sometimes used as the unofficial military time zone code for local time
 "J" Is for Judgment, the tenth novel in Sue Grafton's "Alphabet mystery" series, published in 1993
 Guy Big J, range of trucks produced by Guy Motors of England between 1964 and 1978
 [J], code for academic journal in the reference section of an academic work

See also
 J/22, J/24 and J/80 sailboat classes
 J Mays, Group Vice President of Design and Chief Creative Officer at Ford Motor Company
 J Dilla, a hip-hip performer and producer
 Jay-Z, a hip-hop performer
 Jay (disambiguation)
 Jay Jay, a 2003 film
 JJJ (disambiguation)